Five Years is an autobiographical collection of Paul Goodman's notebooks between 1955 and 1960.

Publication 

The entries in his original journals were modified for publication. The original journals were acquired from Goodman's wife in 1989 and are held at Harvard University's Houghton Library.

References

Further reading

Further reading 

 
 
 
 
 
 
 
 
 
 
 
 
 

1966 books
American autobiographies
Books by Paul Goodman
English-language books
LGBT autobiographies